Friedrich Karl Florian (4 February 1894 – 24 October 1975) was the Gauleiter of Gau Düsseldorf throughout its existence in Nazi Germany.

Early life
The son of a Prussian railway master, Florian moved in his youth to East Prussia. After graduating from the gymnasium in Stallupönen he became a mining official in Buer in the Prussian Province of Westphalia. Shot down and captured by British troops in May 1918, he spent the remainder of the war as a prisoner of war and was released from captivity in November 1919.

In the postwar years, he resumed his work as a mining official until 1929. From 1920–1922 he was a member of  Deutschvölkischer Schutz- und Trutzbund, the largest, most active, and most influential anti-Semitic federation in Germany. Active in the resistance to the French occupation of the Ruhr, he was briefly banished from the area in 1923. He was cofounder of the Westphalia Loyalty Federation and returned to Buer in 1924. Politically, he was a leader in the Ruhr area of the Völkisch-Social Bloc and the National Socialist Freedom Movement, both right wing nationalist parties.

Nazi career
Florian joined the Nazi Party on 18 August 1925 (membership number 16,699). He founded the local Party organization in Buer and was its Ortsgruppenleiter (Local Group Leader) from 1925 to 1927. He also joined the Sturmabteilung (SA) in August 1925 as a Sturmführer. He advanced to Kreisleiter (County Leader) from 1927 to 1929. He concurrently served until 1929 as the only Nazi City Councilor in Gelsenkirchen.

On 1 October 1929, Florian was named the Bezirksleiter (District Leader) for Bergisches Land-Niederrhein, succeeding Fritz Hartl. When this area was upgraded to Gau status on 1 August 1930, Florian was named the first (and only) Gauleiter of Gau Düsseldorf. In September 1930 he was elected as a member of the Reichstag from electoral district 22, Düsseldorf. In these years Florian also founded the publishing company Volkischer Verlag and the Nazi newspapers Wuppertaler Zeitung and Bergischer Beobachter. In April 1932, he became a member of the Landtag of Prussia and in September 1933 of the Prussian State Council. On 25 September 1933 he was promoted to SA-Gruppenführer. Also in 1933 he was made Chairman of the Rhenish Local Parliament and appointed to the Rhenish Provincial Landtag. In 1934 he was made a member of the Prussian Provincial Council for the Rhine Province, and in 1935 was elected to the Academy for German Law. In May 1936, he was appointed to the Reichsleitung, the Nazi Party national leadership. On 30 January 1937 he attained the rank of SA-Obergruppenführer. 

On 10 November 1938, Florian played an active part in the Kristallnacht pogrom in Düsseldorf, leading SA and Hitler Youth in attacking the home of the  Regierungspräsident Carl Christian Schmid whose wife was Jewish. In the city-wide attacks on Jewish homes and businesses, five persons were killed and hundreds were injured or left homeless.

On 16 November 1942, Florian was named Reich Defense Commissioner for his Gau and in October 1944 he was made head of the Düsseldorf Volkssturm contingent. 
 
On 23 March 1945, Florian and two other Gauleiters from the industrial Ruhr area (Albert Hoffmann and Fritz Schlessmann) met with Reichsminister of Armaments and War Production Albert Speer. Speer tried to convince them to ignore Adolf Hitler’s Nero Decree mandating a scorched earth policy ahead of the Allied armies’ advance. A rabid Nazi, Florian alone argued in favor of the policy. He read aloud a proclamation he intended to issue ordering evacuation of the population of Düsseldorf and setting fire to all buildings, leaving the Allies a burned out, deserted city. However, in the end, he did not issue the proclamation and was unable to implement these drastic actions before the Allies captured the city.

Postwar life
Captured by US forces on 17 April 1945 and interned at the Esterwegen concentration camp, Florian made two suicide attempts while in custody, by poison and by jumping out a third floor window. He was charged with ordering the execution of five Düsseldorf citizens who in April 1945 had attempted to surrender the city to the US Army, but he was acquitted in March 1949. Shortly afterward in June 1949, Florian was convicted by the denazification court and was sentenced to six years in prison and a 20,000 Reichsmark fine because of his leadership role in the Nazi Party. Taking into consideration time already served, he was released on 1 May 1951. He then found employment as an industrial representative. He remained a convinced Nazi and maintained contact with former associates from the Nazi era.

Character assessment
During his stay in Düsseldorf, the racialist, right-wing journalist Lothrop Stoddard described Florian thus: "He was a distinctly sinister-looking type; hard-faced, with a cruel eye and a still crueler mouth.  A sadist, if I ever saw one. I can imagine how unpopular he must be among the good-natured, kindly Duesseldorfers."

Decorations and awards
1914 Iron Cross Second Class
Golden Party Badge, c.1933
Honour Chevron for the Old Guard, February 1934
The Honour Cross of the World War 1914/1918 with Swords, 1934
Anschluss Medal, c.1938
Sudetenland Medal, c.1939

Notes

External links 
 
 Picture of Friedrich Karl Florian

Sources 

 
 
 

1894 births
1975 deaths
Gauleiters
Members of the Academy for German Law
Members of the Reichstag of Nazi Germany
Members of the Reichstag of the Weimar Republic
Military personnel from Essen
Nazis convicted of crimes
Nazi Party officials
Nazi Party politicians
People from the Rhine Province
Recipients of the Iron Cross (1914), 2nd class
Sturmabteilung officers
Volkssturm personnel
Luftstreitkräfte personnel
German Army personnel of World War I
Shot-down aviators
German prisoners of war in World War I
World War I prisoners of war held by the United Kingdom